The Ramsey Academy is a coeducational secondary school with academy status, located in Halstead, Essex, England.

History
In 1975 three local schools, including Earls Colne Grammar School, Halstead Grammar School and Halstead Secondary School, amalgamated into the Ramsey School, as part of the re-organisation of schooling along comprehensive lines.  The school was named Dame Mary Ramsey, a 16th-century local educational philanthropist. The school was later renamed The Ramsey College.

The 2006 Ofsted report averaged the college at a satisfactory grade. However this was revoked by the Ofsted report in 2012, when the school was placed under special measures. The school converted to academy status in September 2013, and was renamed The Ramsey Academy.

In 2013, the school was once again graded as "good" in most areas and "outstanding" for leadership and management.

Notable former pupils
 Steve Lamacq, BBC Radio DJ

References

Secondary schools in Essex
Academies in Essex
Educational institutions established in 1975
Halstead
1975 establishments in England